Kalateh-ye Sadat (also Romanized as Kalāteh-ye Sādāt) is a village in Beyhaq Rural District, Sheshtomad District, Sabzevar County, Razavi Khorasan Province, Iran. At the 2006 census, its population was 272, in 81 families.

References 

Populated places in Sabzevar County